Cheyelle Robins-Reti (born 9 March 1997) is a New Zealand rugby union player. She has represented New Zealand in fifteens and sevens internationally. She played for Hurricanes Poua before switching to play for Matatū in the Super Rugby Aupiki competition. She represents Waikato provincially.

Early life 
Originally from Taranaki, Robins-Reti relocated to Perth with her mother and attended Aranmore Catholic College. She later moved to Hamilton and studied for a Bachelor of Sport and Exercise. She is from the Ngāti Ruanui iwi.

Rugby career

2016–20 
Robins-Reti debuted for Waikato in 2016 and soon after made her debut for the Black Ferns Sevens at the 2017 USA Women's Sevens in Las Vegas. She played sevens in Japan for the Hokkaido Barbarians before she returned to New Zealand in 2019.

In 2020, she played for the Possibles against the Probables in a Black Ferns trial match. She played for the Black Ferns against the New Zealand Barbarians at Waitākere.

2021–23 
In 2021 she was selected for the Black Ferns tour of Europe. She made her test debut against England on 7 November at Northampton. She joined the Hurricanes Poua for the inaugural Super Rugby Aupiki season in 2022.

Robins-Reti was named in the Black Ferns squad for the 2022 Pacific Four Series. For the 2023 Super Rugby Aupiki season, she moved to the South Island to play for Matatū.

References

External links 

 Black Ferns Profile

1997 births
Living people
New Zealand women's international rugby union players
New Zealand female rugby union players
New Zealand women's international rugby sevens players